Geulah Cohen (
25 December 1925 – 18 December 2019) was an Israeli politician and activist who founded the Tehiya party. She won the Israel Prize in 2003. Between 1974 and 1992, she served as a member of Knesset, initially for Likud. She changed her political affiliation to Tehiya in 1979. In 1992, she lost her seat in the Knesset.

Life and career
Geulah Cohen was born in Tel Aviv to a Mizrahi Jewish family (from Yemen, Morocco, and Turkey) during the Mandate era. She was the daughter of Miriam and Yosef Cohen. She studied at the Levinsky Teachers Seminary, and earned a master's degree in Jewish Studies, Philosophy, Literature and Bible at the Hebrew University of Jerusalem.

In 1942 she joined the Irgun, and moved to Lehi the following year. A radio announcer for the group, she was arrested by the British military authorities in 1946  while broadcasting in Tel Aviv. She escaped in May, shortly before her trial, but was recaptured by a group of Arabs. On 6 June 1946, she was sentenced to seven years imprisonment (nineteen years according to Encyclopaedia Judaica) after being charged with being in possession of a wireless transmitter, four pistols and revolvers and ammunition. During sentencing she sang "Hatikvah" and was accompanied by 30 members of her family. She was imprisoned in Bethlehem, but escaped from jail in 1947. She was also editor of the Lehi newspaper Youth Front. After Israeli independence in 1948, she contributed to Sulam, a monthly magazine published by former Lehi leader Israel Eldad.

Cohen married former Lehi comrade Emanuel Hanegbi. From 1961 to 1973, she wrote for the Israeli newspaper Maariv and served on its editorial board. While working as a journalist, she came to New York to visit the Lubavitcher Rebbe, Rabbi Menachem Mendel Schneerson. Schneerson encouraged her to get involved with Israeli youth.

Cohen died on 18 December 2019, one week before her 94th birthday.

Political career
In 1972, Cohen joined Menachem Begin's Herut party, then part of the Gahal alliance, and was elected to the Knesset the following year, by which time Gahal had become Likud. She was re-elected in 1977.

As an opponent of the Camp David Accords and the return of Sinai to Egypt as a land-for-peace deal, even to the extent of being thrown out of the Knesset when Begin presented the deal to it, Cohen and Moshe Shamir left Likud in 1979 to found a new right-wing party Banai, later Tehiya-Bnai, and then  Tehiya. The new party was a strong supporter of Gush Emunim and included prominent members of Israeli settlements in the West Bank and Gaza such as Hanan Porat and Elyakim Haetzni.

Cohen retained her seat in the 1981 elections, and despite their previous differences, Tehiya joined Begin's coalition. She retained her seat during the elections in 1984 and 1988, and in June 1990, following a coalition crisis, was appointed to the cabinet as Deputy Minister of Science and Technology.

Cohen lost her seat in the 1992 elections. That year, she rejoined Likud and remained active in right-wing politics. Her son, Tzachi Hanegbi, serves as a Knesset member for Likud.

Views and opinions
Cohen opposed territorial concessions. She was a vocal critic of the Camp David Accords in 1978 and of Israel's unilateral disengagement plan from Gaza in 2005. She described herself as a "woman of violence" in the pursuit of political ends.

Awards and recognition
 In 2003, Cohen was awarded the Israel Prize for her lifetime achievements and special contribution to society and the State of Israel.
 In 2007, she received the Yakir Yerushalayim (Worthy Citizen of Jerusalem) award from the city of Jerusalem.

Published work
Story of a Warrior (1961; Hebrew autobiography)
 (autobiography)
Historical Meeting (1986) (Hebrew)
Ein li koah lehiyot ayefa ("No Strength To Be Tired"; 2008)

References

External links

Geulah Cohen: The Israeli revolutionary who bewitched Anwar Sadat Haaretz.

1925 births
2019 deaths
Hebrew University of Jerusalem alumni
Sephardi Jews in Mandatory Palestine
Jewish Israeli politicians
Israel Prize for lifetime achievement & special contribution to society recipients
Israeli people of Moroccan-Jewish descent
Israeli people of Turkish-Jewish descent
Israeli people of Yemeni-Jewish descent
Israeli Sephardi Jews
Israeli Mizrahi Jews
Israel Prize women recipients
Women members of the Knesset
Israeli women journalists
Members of the 8th Knesset (1974–1977)
Members of the 9th Knesset (1977–1981)
Members of the 10th Knesset (1981–1984)
Members of the 11th Knesset (1984–1988)
Members of the 12th Knesset (1988–1992)
Lehi (militant group)
Likud politicians
People from Tel Aviv
Tehiya leaders
Deputy ministers of Israel
Far-right politics in Israel
Betar members
Jewish women politicians
Jewish women activists
Israeli women activists
Maariv (newspaper) editors
Women newspaper editors